Miss Earth USA 2019, titled Miss Earth United States until 2018, was the 15th edition of the Miss Earth USA pageant. It was held at the South Point Hotel, Casino & Spa on June 30, 2019 in Las Vegas, Nevada.

Yashvi Aware of Maryland (representing Midatlantic) crowned her successor Emanii Davis as Miss Earth United States 2019. Davis represented the USA at Miss Earth 2019 and placed first runner-up, earning the title of Miss Earth Air 2019. 

Pageant protocol forces Davis to "resign" her Miss Earth USA title in order to fulfill the international duties of the elemental title. In this case, the first runner-up Libby Hill, who competed as Miss Earth Gulf Coast USA 2019, inherited the title of Miss Earth USA 2019.

Miss Earth 2018, Nguyễn Phương Khánh of Vietnam and Miss Earth Fire 2018, Melissa Flores of Mexico were guests of honor at the pageant. 

It was the first year the pageant was held under its new name, Miss Earth USA.

Background 

On April 26, 2019, the Miss Earth USA organization confirmed the pageant would be held on June 30, 2019 at the South Point Hotel, Casino and Spa in Las Vegas, Nevada. This was the second time Nevada was served as the host state, with Laughlin last hosting in 2010. 

This edition also reflected changes in the age requirement, as the Miss Earth organization announced in January it would increase the age limit to 28.

Results

Awards 

Notes

§ Earned Top 20 placement as highest fund raiser for Charitable Giving Fund

∞ Davis earned title of Miss Earth Air 2019. Due to protocol, Davis resigns her title as Miss Earth USA 2019. 1st runner-up, Libby Hill, replaces her as Miss Earth USA 2019.

^ Templier assumed Miss Earth USA Eco title in November 2019.

High Point Awards

Non-Finalist Awards

Other Awards

Order of announcement

Top 20
 West Coast
 Rhode Island
 Great Lakes
 Kentucky
 Virginia
 Wisconsin
 South Carolina
 Texas
 New Hampshire
 Arkansas
 California
 Montana
 New Jersey
 Nevada
 Florida
 DC
 Georgia
 New York
 Delaware
 Gulf Coast

Top 12
 California
 Texas
 South Carolina
 Gulf Coast
 Georgia
 Rhode Island
 Delaware
 Virginia
 Kentucky
 District of Columbia
 New York
 New Jersey

Top 5
 Delaware
 Georgia
 Gulf Coast
 South Carolina
 California

Pageant 
Pageant activities took place from June 26, 2019 through July 1, 2019 in the Las Vegas, Nevada area, which included both public and private events, and a community service day involving a local park cleanup alongside delegates from the supporting divisions.

Selection of delegates 
14 delegates were crowned during state pageants that were held between February and May 2019. The remaining delegates were appointed regional or at-large state titles by the national pageant office.

Preliminary rounds 
Preliminary rounds took place between June 28-June 30, 2018 at the South Point Hotel. Delegates competed in a private judges and media interviews, private poolside media and swimwear presentations, and on-stage runway and evening gown competitions.

Media interviews were a new phase of competition and were hosted by Payne. On-stage preliminaries were hosted by Payne and the reigning titleholders from the supporting divisions of Miss Earth USA, respectively.

Finals 
Coronation took place on June 30, 2018. During the final competition, the top 20 competed in runway, while the top 12 also competed in swimwear and evening gown. The top five delegates also competed in an on-stage question round and were scored on their response to: What does the power of pageantry mean to you?

Delegates 
Delegate information provided by the Miss Earth USA organization.
{| class="wikitable sortable"
|+
!State
!Name
!Placement
!Notes
|-
| Arkansas 
|Klein Jahne’ Lee Mitchell
|Top 20
|
|-
| California
|Kirstin Bangs
|Miss Earth USA - Eco 2019
|Los Angeles Rams Cheerleader
|-
| Colorado
|Tobie Roberts
|
|Previously Miss Teen Earth United States - Air 2014 representing Kansas
|-
| Connecticut
|Genesis Rueda
|
|Previously competed in 2017 representing South Carolina
|-
| Delaware
|Mia Jones
|Miss Earth USA - Water 2019
|Previously Miss Delaware USA 2017 and Miss Delaware Teen USA 2014, Top 15 at Miss Teen USA 2014
|-
| District of Columbia|Bilikisu Adeyemi
|Top 12
|
|-
| Florida|Chelsea Killman
|Top 20
|
|-
| Georgia|Emanii Davis
|Miss Earth USA 2019|Previously 2nd Runner-up at Miss USA 2016 & 3rd runner-up at Miss World America 2017
|-
| Grand Canyon|Thelima Smith
|
|Previously competed at Miss Black USA 2013 representing Utah
|-
| Great Lakes|Allie Graziano
|Top 20
|Previously Top 15 at Miss Earth United States 2017 representing Michigan
|-
| Great Plains|Amanda Pedrianes
|
|Previously competed in 2017 representing Colorado
|-
| Gulf Coast|Libby Hill
|Miss Earth USA - Air 2019
|Previously Top 16 at Miss Texas USA 2019
|-
| Hawaii|Daniela Scarpelli
|
|
|-
| Idaho|Sarah Massingale
|
|Previously competed in 2018
|-
| Illinois|Brett Brooks
|
|Reporter for WTVO
Previously represented Illinois at Miss Black America 2018 and Miss Black USA 2016
|-
| Kentucky|Emma Rhodes
|
|Previously Top 8 at Teen Miss Earth United States 2018 representing Kentucky
|-
| Maine|Vanessa Sabo
|
|
|-
| Maryland|Bethany Wheatley
|
|Previously competed in 2017 representing Delaware
|-
| Massachusetts|Jamie Connors
|
|Member of the Boston Cannons Dance Team
Previously Top 12 in 2018
|-
| Michigan|Emily Tomchin
|
|
|-
| Midatlantic|Lili Klainer
|
|Previously Top 12 in 2018 representing Virginia
Previously competed for Miss World America 2017 as Virginia
|-
| Midwest|Sara Yeganeh-Kazemi
|
|
|-
| Minnesota|Emily Johnson
|
|
|-
| Missouri|Hunter McDonald
|
|
|-
| Montana|Salena Pham
|Top 20
|
|-
| Nevada|Kirsten Fernow
|Top 20
|
|-
| New England|Isabella Bennett
|
|Previously Top 20 in 2018 and competed in 2017 representing Rhode Island
Second consecutive award for Miss Congeniality
|-
| New Hampshire|Ashley Cooper
|Top 20
|
|-
| New Jersey|Leighke Santiago
|Top 12
|
|-
| New Mexico|Erin Maestas
|
|
|-
| New York|Nicolette Templier
|
|
|-
| North Dakota|Ellie Spicer
|
|
|-
| Northeast|Jillian Rivera
|
|Previously Face of the World USA Teen 2018
|-
| Northwest|Danielle Davidson
|
|
|-
| Ohio|Elena Jean Yemma
|
|
|-
| Oregon|Hannah Cromer
|
|
|-
| Pennsylvania|Krista Collins
|
|
|-
| Rhode Island|Alexandra Curtis
|Top 12
|4th runner-up at Miss World America 2017
Previously Miss Rhode Island 2015, Finalist for Quality of Life Award at Miss America 2016

Contestant at National Sweetheart 2014

Previously National All-American Miss Teen 2010-2011
|-
| South Carolina|Francie Evans
|Miss Earth USA - Fire 2019
|Previously Top 20 in 2018 and Face of the World Miss USA 2018
|-
| South Dakota|Jana Vetter
|
|
|-
| Southeast|Nadya Yurawecz
|
|
|-
| Southwest|Cameron Olson
|
|
|-
| Texas|Ilyhanee Robles
|Top 12
|
|-
| Virgin Islands|Sinead Jenkins
|
|
|-
| Vermont|Nicole Rotante
|
|
|-
| Virginia|Katie Ann Magyar
|Top 12
|
|-
| Washington|Brooke Williams
|
|
|-
| West Coast|Hannah Stout
|Top 20
|
|-
| West Virginia|Mikaela Gillespie
|
|Previously Teen Miss West Virginia Earth 2016
|-
| Wisconsin|Catherine Smith
|Top 20
|
|}

 Withdrawals 

  Alabama – Rebekah Newton
  Arizona – Taylor Fogg
  Central Plains – Madelynn Dixon
  East Coast – Tori Miller – Previously competed in 2018 representing Gulf Coast
  Kansas – Hannah Edelman
  Louisiana – Chelsea Grant
  Nebraska – Melonie Myers
  Rocky Mountains – Louie Caragao
  Utah – Rachel Slawson
  Wyoming''' – Allie Mekolon - Previously competed in 2017 as Teen Miss Nebraska Earth

Judges

Preliminary judges 

 Kristin Chucci, Ms. Earth 2017 and Elite Miss Earth United States 2016
 Yanné Halen Givens - United States of America’s Ms. 2019
 Alyssa Klinzing - Miss Kansas USA 2019 and Miss Teen Miss Earth United States 2015
 Tionna Petramalo, International Ms. USA 2019
 Stephen P. Smith, Founder & CEO of Planet Beach & HOTWORX
 Tanice Smith, Executive Director of the United States of America Pageants

Finals judges 

 Vincenza Carrieri-Russo - Restaurateur, Elite Miss Earth United States 2015 and Miss Delaware USA 2008
 Ashley Lauren Kerr - Creator and lead designer of ASHLEYlauren
 Franz Orban - Owner of Vizcaya Swimwear
 Kamini Shankar - International Ms. 2019

 Dani Walker Miss Montana USA 2018 and YouTube vlogger

References

External links 

 
 Miss Earth USA Facebook page
 Miss Earth USA Instagram

Miss Earth United States
Beauty pageants in the United States